CJDV may refer to:

 CJDV-FM, a radio station (107.5 FM) licensed to Cambridge, Ontario, Canada
 CKDQ, a radio station (910 AM) licensed to Drumheller, Alberta, Canada, which held the call sign CJDV from 1958 to 1981